Geisteswissenschaften ("sciences of mind",  "spirit science") is a set of human sciences such as philosophy, history, philology, musicology, linguistics, theater studies, literary studies, media studies, and sometimes even theology and jurisprudence, that are traditional in German universities. Most of its subject matter would come under Humanities in the typical English-speaking university.

History
The concept of Geist dates back to eighteenth- and nineteenth-century German idealism, in particular to Herder's and Hegel's concept of a Volksgeist, the alleged common "spirit", or rather, mind, of a people. To understand the term Geisteswissenschaften, one should bear in mind that the continental faculty of philosophy inherited the medieval faculty of arts.  Besides philosophy itself it encompassed the natural sciences with mathematics as well as the philological and historical disciplines and later on psychology and the social sciences. The term Geisteswissenschaften first was used as translation of John Stuart Mill’s term “moral sciences”. The historian, philosopher and sociologist Wilhelm Dilthey popularised the term, arguing that psychology and the emerging field of sociology – like the philological and historical disciplines – should be considered as Geisteswissenschaft rather than as Naturwissenschaft (natural science), and that their methodology should reflect this classification. His arguments were very influential in the theories of the prominent German sociologist Max Weber, though Weber preferred the term Kulturwissenschaft, which has been promoted by his neokantian colleagues (Wilhelm Windelband and Heinrich Rickert).

Current use
Since the times of Dilthey it became common to speak of the Naturwissenschaften on the one hand and the Geisteswissenschaften on the other – not particularly considering the status of mathematics and of philosophy itself. After the separation of the natural sciences and mathematics into a particular faculty (in some universities not until the 1950s), the Geisteswissenschaften were left alone in the philosophical faculty and even philosophy often was subsumed under the term Geisteswissenschaften. Meanwhile, many of the German universities have split up these faculties in smaller departments, so that the old common interests and the old borders are less visible.

The term is now used irregularly. In administrative contexts it is used broadly to discuss how to organise the academic institutions and describe the culture of academic discussions, so that the faculties of Theology and Law are added to the Geisteswissenschaften. In some contexts of science policy the Geisteswissenschaften are described as non-empirical sciences, drawing them near philosophy and excluding the social sciences from their area. 

In the context of methodology on the contrary it has been emphasised, that Geisteswissenschaften such as history and the philological disciplines, relying on empirical data (documents, books and utterances), along with psychology and the social sciences, have a common empirical character, which is essentially based on comprehension (Verstehen) or understanding of expressions of meaning.

Other authors, like Rudolf Steiner, used the term Geisteswissenschaft in a historically quite distinct sense to refer to a proposed "Science of Spirit".

Example usage 

From Kulturgeschichte Frankreichs, Suchanek-Fröhlich, p. 633:

Man hat Taine vorgeworfen, dass er, dessen Hauptziel die Einführung naturwissenschaftlicher Methoden in die Geisteswissenschaften war, selbst nicht induktiv, sondern deduktiv vorging.

Translation:

Some reproach Taine in that he himself, whose goal was the introduction of the methods of natural science into the Geisteswissenschaften, proceeded from methods which were not inductive but rather deductive.

References

Bibliography 
 Gunter Scholz, Zwischen Wissenschaftsanspruch und Orientierungsbedürfnis. Zu Grundlage und Wandel der Geisteswissenschaften Frankfurt am Main, Suhrkamp 1991, 
 Bernward Grünewald, Geist – Kultur – Gesellschaft. Versuch einer Prinzipientheorie der Geisteswissenschaften auf transzendentalphilosophischer Grundlage, Berlin, Duncker & Humblot, 2009, .
 Albrecht Behmel, Erfolgreich im Studium der Geisteswissenschaften, Francke, Tübingen 2005, 

Humanities education
Education in Germany
Wilhelm Dilthey